Bitheca is a genus of flies belonging to the family Lesser Dung flies.

Species
B. agarica Marshall, 1987
B. boleta Marshall, 1987
B. caballa Marshall, 1987
B. dispar Marshall, 1987
B. ejuncida Marshall, 1987
B. fundata Marshall, 1987
B. grossa Marshall, 1987
B. horrida Marshall, 1987
B. involuta Marshall, 1987
B. jubilata Marshall, 1987
B. kappa Marshall, 1987
B. lambda Marshall, 1987
B. masoni (Marshall, 1985)
B. steyskali (Deeming, 1980)
B. xanthocephala (Spuler, 1925)

References

Sphaeroceridae
Diptera of North America
Diptera of South America
Schizophora genera